was the 104th emperor of Japan, according to the traditional order of succession. He reigned from November 16, 1500, to May 19, 1526.  His personal name was Katsuhito (勝仁).  His reign marked the nadir of Imperial authority during the Ashikaga shogunate.

Genealogy 
He was the first son of Emperor Go-Tsuchimikado.  His mother was Niwata (Minamoto) Asako (庭田（源）朝子), the daughter of Niwata Nagakata (庭田長賢).
Lady-in-waiting: Kajūji (Fujiwara) Fujiko (1464–1535; 勧修寺（藤原）藤子) later Hōraku-mon'in (豊楽門院), Kajūji Norihide’s daughter
First daughter: Princess Kakuten (1486–1550; 覚鎮女王)
First son:?? (1493)
Second son: Imperial Prince Tomohito (知仁親王) later Emperor Go-Nara
Fifth son: Imperial Prince Kiyohiko (1504–1550; 清彦親王) later Imperial Prince Priest Sonten (尊鎮法親王)
Lady-in-waiting: Niwata (Minamoto) Motoko (庭田（源）源子), Niwata Masayuki’s daughter
Third son: Imperial Prince Priest Kakudō (1500–1527; 覚道法親王)
Second daughter: Princess Kakuon (1506–?; 覚音女王)
Sixth son: Imperial Prince Hirotsune (1509–1536; 寛恒親王) later Imperial Prince Priest Gen'in (彦胤法親王)
Handmaid (?): Takakura (Fujiwara) Tsuguko (高倉（藤原）継子), Takakura Nagatsugu’s daughter
Fourth son: Doko (1503–1530; 道喜)

Events of Go-Kashiwabara's life 
In 1500, he became Emperor upon the death of his father, the Emperor Go-Tsuchimikado.  However, because of the after-effects of the Ōnin War, the Imperial Family was left so impoverished that he was unable to perform the formal coronation ceremony.   On the 3rd month, 22nd day of 1521, thanks to contributions from Honganji Jitsunyo (本願寺実如, Rennyo's son) and the Muromachi Bakufu, the Emperor was finally able to carry out this ceremony.

Because of the Ōnin War, the scattering of the Court Nobility, and the poverty of the Imperial Court, the Emperor's authority fell to a low point.

 Bunki 1 (1501): The former Shōgun Ashikaga Yoshimura was exiled; and he retired to Suō Province.  The former shōgun lived in exile in the home of the daimyō of that han.  He changed his name to Ashikaga Yoshitane.  He had many supporters, and he summoned the military forces of western Japan to come to his aid. Hosokawa Masamoto was made master of all the provinces which encircled the Kinai.
 Bunki 2, in the 7th month (1502): Minamoto Yoshitane was elevated to the 2nd tier of the 4th class of kuge officials; and he expressed thanks to the emperor for that honor.  In the same month, the name of Ashikaga Yoshitaka was changed to that of Yoshizumi.
 Bunki 3 (1503): There was a great drought in the summer of this year.
 Eishō 1 (1504): A great famine.
 Eishō 5, in the 1st month (1508):  A new revolt in Miyako and the assassination of Hosokawa Masamoto encouraged former-Shōgun Ashikaga Yoshitane in believing that this would be a good opportunity to re-take Miyako.  He assembled his troops and marched at their head towards the capital; and by the 6th month of Eishō 5, he was once more in command of the streets of Miyako. Starting in 1508, Yoshitane is known as the Muromachi period's 10th shōgun
 Eishō 9, following the Three Ports Riots of 1510 in Joseon Korea, the Emperor made concessions that led to the Agreement of 1512 and reconciliation with the Korean government.
 Daiei 5, on the 1st day of the 1st month (1525):  All ceremonies in the court were suspended because of the lack of funds to support them.
 Daiei 6, on the 7th day of the 4th month (1525): Go-Kashiwabara died at the age of 63 years.  He had reigned 26 years; that is, his reign lasted 3 years in the nengō Bunki, 17 years in the nengō Eishō, and 6 years in the nengō Daiei.  The emperor was found dead in his archives.

Emperor Go-Kashiwabara is enshrined with other emperors at the imperial tomb called Fukakusa no kita no misasagi (深草北陵) in Fushimi-ku, Kyoto.

Kugyō 
Kugyō (公卿) is a collective term for the very few most powerful men attached to the court of the Emperor of Japan in pre-Meiji eras. Even during those years in which the court's actual influence outside the palace walls was minimal, the hierarchic organization persisted.

In general, this elite group included only three to four men at a time.  These were hereditary courtiers whose experience and background would have brought them to the pinnacle of a life's career.  During Go-Kashiwabara's reign, this apex of the Daijō-kan included:
 Sadaijin
 Udaijin
 Naidaijin
 Dainagon

Eras of Go-Kashiwabara's reign 
The years of Go-Kashiwabara's reign are more specifically identified by more than one era name or nengō.
 Meiō           (1492–1501)
 Bunki               (1501–1504)
 Eishō        (1504–1521)
 Daiei  (1521–1528)

Ancestry

Notes

References 

 Ponsonby-Fane, Richard Arthur Brabazon. (1959).  The Imperial House of Japan. Kyoto: Ponsonby Memorial Society. OCLC 194887
 Titsingh, Isaac, ed. (1834). [Siyun-sai Rin-siyo/Hayashi Gahō, 1652], Nipon o daï itsi ran; ou, Annales des empereurs du Japon.  Paris: Oriental Translation Fund of Great Britain and Ireland.
 Varley, H. Paul , ed. (1980). [ Kitabatake Chikafusa, 1359], Jinnō Shōtōki  (A Chronicle of Gods and Sovereigns: Jinnō Shōtōki. New York: Columbia University Press.

See also 
 Emperor of Japan
 List of Emperors of Japan
 Imperial cult

Japanese emperors
1464 births
1526 deaths
Emperor Go-Kashiwabara
Emperor Go-Kashiwabara
Emperor Go-Kashiwabara
Emperor Go-Kashiwabara
15th-century Japanese monarchs
16th-century Japanese monarchs